Ptiloedaspis is a genus of tephritid  or fruit flies in the family Tephritidae.

Species
Ptiloedaspis tavaresiana Bezzi, 1920

References

Tephritinae
Tephritidae genera
Taxa named by Mario Bezzi
Diptera of Europe